Antidisestablishmetabolism is the first album released by the hip hop group Heiruspecs.  It was released in 2000 under Interlock records. Some tracks were recorded live. The album's title is a play on the word "antidisestablishmentarianism".

Track listing
Kung fu
State of the Union
If you like this
I Write raps
Pauses
Life as a Superhero
Progressional skill
Have you ever Wondered?
Bon Apetit Headcheck
Hey yo
Felix and Twinkie Jiggles
Relax
Band Intros
Still Rappin'
Stardust
Connect
All that Scratchin
Live band
Gettin' Faster
Song #3
Craig the white Nubian

References

2000 debut albums
Heiruspecs albums